Gergely Kisgyörgy (born 8 March 1976) is a former professional tennis player from Hungary.

Kisgyörgy was twice the runner-up at the Hungarian Tennis Championships, in 1999 and 2001, but was more successful as a doubles player during his career. He won seven doubles titles on the Challenger circuit and participated in one Grand Slam, the 2004 Wimbledon Championships. With Łukasz Kubot as his partner, the pair defeated South Americans Juan Ignacio Chela and Luis Horna in a close first round encounter, won 9–7 in the third set. They were then eliminated in the second round by Bob and Mike Bryan.

He began playing Davis Cup matches for Hungary in 1997 and went on to appear in a total of 24 ties. In singles he won 16 of his 24 singles rubbers and was the victor in seven out of 13 doubles matches.

Challenger titles

Doubles: (7)

References

1976 births
Living people
Hungarian male tennis players
20th-century Hungarian people
21st-century Hungarian people